Nikolay Mosolov, or N. Massaloff (1845–1914) was a Russian engraver and lithographer known for his etchings after works in Russian museums. 

He was the son of the etcher and print collector Semyon Nicolaevitch Mosolov and studied under Fyodor Iordan at the Imperial Academy of Arts in St. Petersburg. He completed his education in Dresden and Paris, where he worked in the studio of Léopold Flameng as an illustrator and won his first gold medal for his etchings. In 1872 he published in French his etchings from paintings of the Hermitage in Vienna, signing as N. Massaloff. He donated his collection of paintings and prints to the Rumyantsev Museum.

References 

 Biography in the French national library

1845 births
1914 deaths
Russian engravers